Scholarship of Teaching and Learning in Psychology is a quarterly peer-reviewed academic journal established in 2015. It is published by the American Psychological Association. The editor-in-chief is Dana S. Dunn (Moravian University).

Abstracting and indexing
The journal is abstracted and indexed in PsycINFO and Scopus.

References

External links

English-language journals
American Psychological Association academic journals
Educational psychology journals
Quarterly journals
Publications established in 2015